Sir Walter John "Johnny" Scott, 5th Baronet (born 1948) succeeded his father Sir Walter Scott as baronet in 1992. He is a natural historian, broadcaster, columnist, countryside campaigner and farmer.

As of 2016, he held the following positions:
 Joint Master, The North Pennine Hunt
 Founder Member, The Cholmondeley Coursing Club
 President, The Union of Country Sports Workers
 President, The Gamekeepers Welfare Trust
 President, The Tay Valley Wildfowlers Association
 Vice President, The Heather Trust
 Patron, The Sporting Lucas Terrier Association
 Patron, The Wildlife Ark Trust
 Centenary Patron, British Association for Shooting and Conservation.
 Patron, The National Association of Beaters and Pickers Up
 Board member, The European Squirrel Federation

Sir John is best known for writing and co-presenting the BBC2 series Clarissa and the Countryman, with the late Clarissa Dickson Wright. He currently writes for a variety of magazines and periodicals on field sports, food, farming, travel, history and the countryside, including The Field.

Marriage
He was married to Lowell Goddard in 1969 and they had one daughter, born in 1970; the marriage later ended in divorce. In 1977 he married Mary Gavin Anderson.

Publications
 Clarissa and the Countryman with Clarissa Dickson Wright (Headline Publishing Group, 2000)
 Clarissa and the Countryman: Sally Forth with Clarissa Dickson Wright (Headline Publishing Group, 2001)
 Sunday Roast: The Complete Guide to Cooking and Carving withClarissa Dickson Wright (Headline Publishing Group, 2003)
 The Game Cookbook with Clarissa Dickson Wright (Kyle Cathie, 2004)
 A Greener Life: The Modern Country Compendium with Clarissa Dickson Wright (F&W Media International (previously David & Charles), 2007)
A Book of Britain (HarperCollins, 2010)

References

Baronets in the Baronetage of the United Kingdom
1948 births
Living people
Date of birth missing (living people)
Place of birth missing (living people)